Timothy Bruce Fayulu (born 24 July 1999) is a professional footballer who plays as a goalkeeper for the Swiss club Winterthur on loan from Sion. Born in Switzerland, he has represented both his birthplace and DR Congo at a youth international level.

Professional career
Fayulu began his footballing career as a forward with CS Italien when he was 7 years old. Switching to goalkeeper after a growth spurt, he spent his early career with various youth clubs in Switzerland before moving to Sion in 2018. Fayulu made his professional debut for the Swiss club in a 3-0 Swiss Super League win over Grasshopper on 22 May 2019.

Often used as a second-choice goalkeeper in the earliest stages of his career, the first choice being Kevin Fickentscher, during the 2020–21 season he started featuring for Sion more regularly, in alternative to the same team-mate. He started the 2021–22 season as the starter at Sion, before soon losing the starting spot to Fickentscher once again.

On 24 June 2022, Fayulu moved on a season-long loan to Winterthur.

International career
Born in Switzerland, Fayulu is of Congolese descent. He represented the DR Congo U18 side in a friendly 8-0 loss to the England U17 in October 2015.

In March 2021, he received his first call-up both from the Congolese senior national team (for two Africa Cup of Nations qualification matches) and the Swiss under-21 national team: he chose the latter side, thus being selected in the squad that would take part in the UEFA European Under-21 Championship in Hungary and Slovenia.

References

External links
 
 SFV U20 Profile
 Olympique Geneve Profile
 SFL Profile

1999 births
Living people
Footballers from Geneva
Citizens of the Democratic Republic of the Congo through descent
Democratic Republic of the Congo footballers
Democratic Republic of the Congo youth international footballers
Swiss men's footballers
Swiss people of Democratic Republic of the Congo descent
FC Sion players
FC Winterthur players
Swiss Super League players
Swiss Challenge League players
Association football goalkeepers